Career Development and Transition for Exceptional Individuals is a triannual peer-reviewed academic journal that covers research  in the fields of secondary education, transition, and career development of persons with documented disabilities and/or special needs. The editors-in-chief are  Erik W. Carter (Vanderbilt University) and Valerie L. Mazzotti (University of North Carolina). It was established in 1978 and is currently published by SAGE Publications in association with the Hammill Institute on Disabilities and Division on Career Development and Transition of The Council for Exceptional Children.

Abstracting and indexing 
Career Development and Transition for Exceptional Individuals is abstracted and indexed in:
 Contents Pages in Education
 Educational Research Abstracts Online
 ERIC
 PsycINFO
 Scopus

External links 
 
 Hammill Institute on Disabilities
 Division on Career Development and Transition of The Council for Exceptional Children

Career development
English-language journals
Publications established in 1978
SAGE Publishing academic journals
Special education journals
Triannual journals